Pattern-Oriented Software Architecture is a series of software engineering books describing software design patterns.

POSA1 

Architectural patterns
 Layers
 Pipes and filters
 Blackboard
 Broker
 Model–View–Controller
 Presentation–Abstraction–Control

Design patterns
 Whole–Part
 Master–Slave
 Proxy
 Command Processor
 View Handler
 Forwarder-Receiver
 Client–Dispatcher–Server
 Publisher–subscriber

POSA2 

Service access and configuration patterns
 Wrapper Facade
 Component Configurator
 Interceptor
 Extension interface
Event handling patterns
 Reactor
 Proactor
 Asynchronous Completion Token
 Acceptor-Connector
Synchronization patterns
 Scoped Locking
 Strategized Locking
 Thread-Safe Interface
 Double-checked locking
Concurrency patterns
 Active object
 Monitor Object
 Half-Sync/Half-Async
 Leader/Followers
 Thread-Specific Storage

POSA3 

Resource acquisition
 Lookup
 Lazy acquisition
 Eager acquisition

Resource lifecycle
 Caching
 Pooling
 Coordinator
 Resource Lifecycle Manager

Resource release
 Leasing
 Evictor

POSA4 

Software architecture
 Domain model
 Layers
 Model–View–Controller
 Presentation–Abstraction–Control
 Microkernel
 Reflection
 Pipes and filters
 Shared repository
 Blackboard
 Domain object

Distribution Infrastructure
 Message Channel
 Message endpoint
 Message translator
 Message route
 Publisher–subscriber
 Broker
 Client proxy
 Requestor
 Invoker
 Client request handler
 server request handler

Adaptation and execution
 Bridge
 Object Adapter
 Chain of responsitiblity
 Interpreter
 Interceptor
 Visitor
 Decorator
 Execute-Around Object
 Template method
 Strategy
 Null Object
 Wrapper Facade
 Declarative component configuration

Resource management
 Container
 Component Configurator
 Object manager
 Lookup
 Virtual Proxy
 Lifecycle callback
 Task coordinator
 Resource pool
 Resource cache
 Lazy Acquisition
 Eager Acquisition
 Partial Acquisition
 Activator
 Evictor
 Leasing
 Automated Garbage Collection
 Counting Handle
 Abstract Factory
 Builder
 Factory method
 Disposal Method

Database access
 Database Access Layer
 Data mapper
 Row Data Gateway
 Table Data Gateway
 Active Record

POSA5 

Patterns referenced in volume 5:
 Abstract Factory
 Acceptor-Connector
 Active Object
 Adapted Iterator
 Adapter
 Align Architecture and Organization (see Conway's Law)
 Application Controller
 Architect Also Implements
 Architecture Follows Organization
 Asynchronous Completion Token (ACT)
 Automated Garbage Collection
 Batch Iterator
 Batch Method
 Blackboard
 Bridge
 Broker
 Build Prototypes
 Builder
 Bureaucracy
 Business Delegate
 Cantrip
 Chain of Responsibility
 Class Adapter
 CLI Server
 Client Proxy
 Collections for States
 Combined Method
 Command
 Command Processor
 Command Sequence (see Composite Command)
 Community of Trust
 Compiler
 Completion Headroom
 Component Configurator
 Composite
 Composite Command
 Composite-Strategy-Observer (see Model-View-Controller (MVC))
 Context Object
 Conway's Law
 Cooperate, Don’t Control
 CORBA-CGI Gateway
 Data Access Object (DAO)
 Data is the Next Intel Inside
 Data Transfer Object (DTO)
 Decorator
 Disposal Method
 Distributed Callback
 Domain Appropriate Devices
 Domain Model
 Domain Object
 Domain Store
 Don't Flip the Bozo Bit
 Dynamic Invocation Interface (DII)
 ed
 Encapsulated Context (see Context Object)
 Engage Customers
 Enumeration Method
 Explicit Interface
 External Iterator
 Facade
 Factory Method
 Few Panes Per Window
 Filter
 Firewall Proxy
 Flat and Narrow Tree
 Forwarder-Receiver
 Front Controller
 Half-Sync/Half-Asynchronous
 Harnessing Collective Intelligence
 Immutable Value
 Information Just In Time
 Interceptor
 Internal Iterator (see Enumeration Method)
 Interpreter
 Invisible Hardware
 Involve Everyone
 Iterator
 Layers
 Leader/Followers
 Leveraging the Long Tail
 Macro Command (see Composite Command)
 Manager (see Object Manager)
 Mediator
 Memento
 Message
 Methods for States
 Mock Object
 Model-View-Controller (MVC)
 Monitor Object
 Mutable Companion
 Network Effects by Default
 Nouns and Verbs
 Null Object
 Object Adapter
 Object Manager
 Objects for States
 Observer
 Organization Follows Architecture
 Page Controller
 Perpetual Beta
 Pipes and Filters
 Pluggable Adapter
 Pluggable Factory
 Polyvalent-Program
 Presentation-Abstraction-Control (PAC)
 Proactor
 Prototype
 Prototype-Abstract Factory (see Pluggable Factory)
 Proxy
 Publisher-Subscriber
 Reactor
 Reflection
 Remote Proxy (see Client Proxy)
 Resource Lifecycle Manager (see Object Manager)
 Roguelike
 Separated Engine and Interface
 Short Menus
 Singleton
 Sink
 Smart Pointer
 Software Above the Level of a Single Device
 Some Rights Reserved
 Source
 Stable Intermediate Forms
 Standard Panes
 State (see Objects for States)
 Strategized Locking
 Strategy
 Template Method
 Template View
 The Long Tail (see Leveraging the Long Tail)
 The Perpetual Beta (see Perpetual Beta)
 Transfer Object (see Data Transfer Object)
 Transform View
 Two-Way Adapter
 Users Add Value (see Harnessing Collective Intelligence)
 View Handler
 Visitor
 Window Per Task
 Wrapped Class Adapter
 Wrapper (see Adapter and Decorator)
 Wrapper Facade

1996 non-fiction books
2000 non-fiction books
2004 non-fiction books
2007 non-fiction books
Software development books
Software design patterns